Zachary Ryall Henderson (October 14, 1955 – April 20, 2020) was an American professional football player who played in the Canadian Football League for four years. Henderson played defensive back for the Hamilton Tiger-Cats and Toronto Argonauts from 1978-1983. Henderson also played one season in the National Football League for the Philadelphia Eagles. He played college football at the University of Oklahoma, where he was a two-time All-American. He died in Oklahoma City on April 20, 2020.

References

External links
College Bio

1955 births
2020 deaths
People from Jena, Louisiana
Players of American football from Louisiana
All-American college football players
Oklahoma Sooners football players
Hamilton Tiger-Cats players
Toronto Argonauts players
Philadelphia Eagles players
American players of Canadian football
Canadian football defensive backs
American football defensive backs